Barbara is a comune (municipality) in the Province of Ancona in the Italian region Marche, located about  west of Ancona.

Barbara borders the following municipalities: Arcevia, Castelleone di Suasa, Ostra Vetere, Serra de' Conti.

Demographic evolution

References

External links
 Official website

Cities and towns in the Marche